First Presbyterian Church, known also as First United Presbyterian Church, is a church located at 602 Vermillion Street in downtown Hastings, Minnesota, United States, listed on the National Register of Historic Places.  It is significant for its Romanesque architecture.  The building is characterized by its massive quality, its thick walls, round arches, large towers, and decorative arcading.

The congregation was established in 1855 by Reverend Charles LeDuc, the brother of William LeDuc. The congregation built a stone church at that time, then decided to build a new, larger church in 1875.  It was designed by Charles N. Daniels.  Because of financial difficulties, it took nearly seven years to finish the building, although it was complete enough to host its first services in 1881.

In 1907 the tall steeple was struck by lightning, which started a fire that left the church gutted.  Architect Harry Wild Jones from Minneapolis was hired to design the restoration.  He was asked to make the new church resemble the original as much as possible, so both the interior and the exterior are his work.

See also
 National Register of Historic Places listings in Dakota County, Minnesota

References

External links
 
 First Presbyterian Church

19th-century Presbyterian church buildings in the United States
1855 establishments in Minnesota Territory
Buildings and structures in Hastings, Minnesota
Churches completed in 1881
Churches in Dakota County, Minnesota
Churches on the National Register of Historic Places in Minnesota
National Register of Historic Places in Dakota County, Minnesota
Presbyterian churches in Minnesota